Nepenthes × trusmadiensis (after Mount Trus Madi), or the Trus Madi Pitcher-Plant, is a natural hybrid of two famous Bornean pitcher plant species: N. lowii and N. macrophylla. It is restricted to Mount Trus Madi, where both of its parent species are sympatric.

Botanical history
Nepenthes × trusmadiensis was discovered by Johannes Marabini and John Briggs in 1983. It was described the same year by Marabini. Briggs wrote the following account of its discovery:

We were about to leave the summit around 8.00 a.m. when Johannes Marabini emerged from a dense bush [...] holding two huge pitchers quite unlike any other species. The most striking feature was the sheer size of the pitchers—they were bigger than anything else on Trus Madi. Later on, we were to realise that they were the second biggest pitchers of all the Borneo Nepenthes—exceeded only by those of N. rajah on Kinabalu. [...] The evidence strongly suggested the new pitcher-plant was a hybrid of N. lowii and N. edwardsiana. The great size of the pitchers agreed with this idea—being characteristic of hybrids. There was no time to investigate the distribution of this new plant. So, after collecting a few specimens we set off down the mountain for the three-day trek back to Tambunan.

Description

Nepenthes × trusmadiensis has petiolate leaves measuring up to 50 cm in length. The pitchers of this hybrid are some of the largest of any Bornean Nepenthes species, reaching 35 cm in height. They are roughly intermediate in form between those of its parent species. The lid is held away from the mouth as in N. lowii and bears short bristles on its lower surface. The peristome has prominent ribs and teeth, but is not as developed as that of N. macrophylla. The inflorescence of N. × trusmadiensis may be up to 50 cm long and has two-flowered pedicels. Despite the size of the pitchers, this hybrid is not large in stature.

Ecology
Nepenthes × trusmadiensis is restricted to the summit ridge of Mount Trus Madi and has been recorded from elevations of 2500 to 2600 m above sea level.

References

Further reading

 Damit, A. 2014. A trip to Mount Trus Madi – the Nepenthes wonderland. Carnivorous Plant Newsletter 43(1): 19–22.
 Fretwell, S. 2013. Back in Borneo to see giant Nepenthes. Part 3: Mt. Trusmadi and Mt. Alab. Victorian Carnivorous Plant Society Journal 109: 6–15.
 Marabini, J. 1984.   Carnivorous Plant Newsletter 13(2): 38–40.
 Marabini, J. 1996. re:nepenthes book. Carnivorous Plant Mailing List, May 30, 1996.
 McPherson, S.R. & A. Robinson 2012. Field Guide to the Pitcher Plants of Borneo. Redfern Natural History Productions, Poole.

Carnivorous plants of Asia
trusmadiensis
Flora of the Borneo montane rain forests